2007–08 Croatian First League was the 18th season of the Croatian handball league since its independence and the seventh and last season of the First League format.

League table

Source: SportNet.hr

2007-08 winning team

RK Croatia Osiguranje Zagreb
GK: Vlado Šola, Dragan Jerković, Vjenceslav Somić
LB: Tonči Valčić, Branko Bedeković, Damir Bičanić
CB: Domagoj Duvnjak, Denis Špoljarić, Josip Valčić, Marko Tarabochia
RB: Kiril Lazarov, Marko Kopljar, Hrvoje Tojčić
RW: Mirza Džomba, Zlatko Horvat, Luka Raković
LW: Nikša Kaleb, Ljubo Vukić, Manuel Štrlek
LP: Branimir Koloper, Igor Vori
Head coach: Nenad Kljaić
Source: eurohandball.com

External links
 hrs.hr - Table and results
Dukat 1.HRL matches
European Handball Federation

2007-08
handball
handball
Croatia